Herbert Thaler (born 22 January 1940 in Imst) is an Austrian luger who competed from the late 1950s to the early 1960s. He won  two medals at the FIL World Luge Championships with a gold in the men's singles (1959) and a silver in the men's doubles event (1960).

References

Austrian male lugers
Living people
1940 births
People from Imst District
Sportspeople from Tyrol (state)